Alison Martin is an American character actress, writer and producer who has appeared on television, film, in podcasts and onstage. She is, along with Alex Trebek's wife Jean, the editor and co-founder of the online magazine insidewink. Martin made her Broadway debut playing opposite Nathan Lane in Neil Simon's Laughter on the 23rd Floor and traveled cross country on the national tour. Martin won an Emmy Award for acting in the children's television series A Likely Story for which she both wrote and acted. She garnered a second Emmy nomination for the Lifetime Channel series The World According to Us for which again she both wrote and acted.

Early life 
Martin was born on September 8 in the Bronx borough of New York City, the only child Joseph G. Martin and Josephine DiLorenzo, both journalists who met and married while working at the New York Daily News.
 
Joseph G. Martin had a career that spanned more than 45 years. As a reporter for the New York Daily News, he won nearly every possible honor for reporting: a Selurians Award (1950); two George Polk Awards (1952 and 1973) and a Newspaper Guild Page One Award (1956). In 1959, Martin won a Pulitzer Prize for international reporting for a 10-part series co-written with Philip Santori on Cuban dictator Fulgencio Batista. The piece predicted the fall of Batista months before it happened and was called “prophetic journalism” by the Pulitzer committee. Martin also served as New York Deputy Police Commissioner for public relations from 1965 to 1968.

Josephine DiLorenzo was raised in the Bronx. A highly gifted student, she graduated high school at 15 and entered Hunter College at 16 years of age. She got a job as one of the first female copyboys at the New York Daily News, working her way up to a reporter. Besides Daily News stories, DiLorenzo wrote celebrity interviews, including in-depth talks with Marilyn Monroe and Elizabeth Taylor.  After becoming a stay-at-home Mom, DiLorenzo continued writing a weekly column for the Daily News titled “Trips and Treats.”

Following her graduation from Ursuline Highschool in the Bronx, Martin attended Boston College, graduating summa cum laude with a degree in Broadcast Communications and Theater. While at Boston College, she founded America’s oldest collegiate improv comedy troupe called My Mother’s Fleabag which boasts a slew of celebrity alumni such as Amy Poehler.

Career

Television 
Martin has starred in hundreds of commercials, two of which she improvised that went on to win Clio Awards.  She has also made more than forty Recurring and Guest Star appearances in shows including How to Get Away with Murder, The Big Bang Theory, Code Black, American Princess, There’s Johnny, Grace & Frankie and The Office.

Film 
Martin’s film appearances include Soul Survivor, The Year of Spectacular Men, Four Christmases, Sleepover, Blades of Glory, and she is best known on the Comic Con trail for her work in Larry Blamire’s Trail of the Screaming Forehead and The Lost Skeleton Returns Again.

Theater 
Martin began her theater career in Boston, performing in America’s Longest Running Comedy, Shear Madness. In New York, Martin appeared Off-Broadway in original productions of works by Peter Tolan, David Ives and David Mamet. Martin made her Broadway debut opposite Nathan Lane in Neil Simon’s Laughter on the 23rd Floor, later continuing with the national tour of the show. Martin is a member of The Echo Theater Company in Los Angeles, most recently performing the role of Soccer Mom in the company's 2019 LA Drama Critics Circle winning production of The Wolves.

Podcasts 
Martin produced and performed in The Audio Adventurebook of Big Dan Frater which won the Gold Nick Danger Mark Time award as best comedy album in 2015.

Filmography

References

External links 
IMDb
insidewink

American actresses
American women writers
American writers
Living people
Year of birth missing (living people)
21st-century American women